Leandro Miguel Fernández (born 12 March 1991) is an Argentine footballer who plays as a forward for Club Universidad de Chile.

Career
Born in Santa Fe, Fernández began his career at Defensa y Justicia. He made his debut on 23 May 2009, as a 74th-minute substitute for Omar Zalazar in a 2–1 loss at Tiro Federal, and made two further substitute appearances that season in Primera B Nacional. He went on to score three goals apiece in each of the three subsequent campaigns, including a brace on 8 May 2010 in a 4–0 win at Gimnasia Jujuy. On 21 August 2011, he was sent off in a 3–2 loss at Patronato.

In early 2012, he was loaned to Club Tijuana in the Liga MX. He made seven appearances, without scoring, and spoke of the effects of altitude on his play after his debut on 5 February in a 1–1 draw at Puebla. For the following season, he was loaned to Ferro Carril Oeste, also of Primera B.

On 2 January 2014, Fernández was loaned for a third time, to CSD Comunicaciones in Guatemala. On 29 January, he was provoked by opponents from CD Malacateco and substituted in the first half, causing him to vandalise furniture in the changing room.

Personal life
Fernández has four footballing brothers: Brian Fernández, Nicolás Fernández, Juan Cruz Villagra and Tomás Villagra; the latter two took their mother's surname.

References

External links
 

1991 births
Living people
Footballers from Santa Fe, Argentina
Argentine footballers
Association football forwards
Defensa y Justicia footballers
Club Tijuana footballers
Ferro Carril Oeste footballers
Comunicaciones F.C. players
Godoy Cruz Antonio Tomba footballers
Sport Club Internacional players
Club Nacional de Football players
Club Atlético Independiente footballers
Universidad de Chile footballers
Primera Nacional players
Liga MX players
Argentine Primera División players
Campeonato Brasileiro Série A players
Uruguayan Primera División players
Chilean Primera División players
Argentine expatriate footballers
Argentine expatriate sportspeople in Mexico
Argentine expatriate sportspeople in Guatemala
Argentine expatriate sportspeople in Brazil
Argentine expatriate sportspeople in Uruguay
Expatriate footballers in Chile
Expatriate footballers in Mexico
Expatriate footballers in Guatemala
Expatriate footballers in Brazil
Expatriate footballers in Uruguay
Fernández/Villagra family